Marco Antonelli (born 18 July 1964 in Bologna) is an Italian race car driver who filled-in for two races of the European Touring Car Championships. He is the father of FRECA driver and Mercedes Junior Team member Andrea Kimi Antonelli. Additionally, he is owner and team principal of AKM Motorsport, which has competed in multiple disciplines of racing including International GT Open, GT World Challenge Europe, Porsche Supercup, Lamborghini Super Trofeo, and the Italian F4 Championship.

Racing record

Career summary

Complete European Touring Car Championship results
(key) (Races in bold indicate pole position) (Races in italics indicate fastest lap)

External links

References

1964 births
Sportspeople from Bologna
Living people
Italian racing drivers
European Touring Car Championship drivers
Porsche Supercup drivers
International GT Open drivers

Sports car racing team owners
Blancpain Endurance Series drivers
GT4 European Series drivers